Frédéric Weis (born 22 June 1977) is a French former professional basketball player.

Professional career
During his pro career, Weis played with Unicaja Málaga and Iurbentia Bilbao of the Spanish ACB League, PAOK Thessaloniki in the Greek League, and Limoges in the French League. On 28 January 2009 Iurbentia Bilbao waived him, after he missed 3 games in a row, due to his health, and on 13 February he signed with ViveMenorca.

He was drafted by the New York Knicks, with the 15th pick in the first round, of the 1999 NBA draft, but he did not sign with them, and never played in the NBA. The draft pick angered many Knicks fans, because Ron Artest, who had grown up in Queens, New York, and played for St. John's University, was still available. Artest was taken with the next pick by the Chicago Bulls. Weis took part in the NBA Summer League, and then declined to sign a rookie contract, being convinced by his agent - who was also a minority owner of Weis's team, Limoges - to return to France. Weis ended up never playing in an NBA game, later stating that in spite of his interest in going to North America, the Knicks never directly contacted him about returning. On 29 August 2008 Weis's draft rights were traded from the New York Knicks, to the Houston Rockets, for Patrick Ewing Jr. In March 2011 he announced his retirement.

National team career
Weis won the silver medal at the 2000 Summer Olympic Games, with the senior French national basketball team. With France's national team he played at the following EuroBaskets: the 1999 EuroBasket, the 2001 EuroBasket, the 2005 EuroBasket, and the 2007 EuroBasket.

At the 2005 EuroBasket, Weis won the bronze medal with his national team. He also played with France's national team at the 2006 FIBA World Championship.

"Le dunk de la mort"
Weis is known for having been posterized by the United States' Vince Carter, during a basketball game between the U.S. and France at the 2000 Summer Olympic Games on 25 September 2000. After getting the ball off a steal, the 6'6" (1.98 m) Carter drove to the basket and spread his legs as he jumped over the 7'2" (2.18 m) Weis before dunking the ball ferociously. The French media dubbed the slam "le dunk de la mort": "the dunk of death". The U.S. won the game 106–94. In an ESPN story published on the 15th anniversary of the dunk, Weis said that Carter "deserves to make history. Sadly for me, I was on the video, too. I learned people can fly."

Personal life
In 2002, Weis' wife, Celia, gave birth to a son, Enzo, while Weis was playing in Spain. After Enzo was diagnosed with autism as a toddler, Weis spiraled into alcoholism and depression, and Celia took their son and returned to France. In 2008, Weis drove to a rest stop in Biarritz, and attempted suicide, by intentionally overdosing on sleeping pills. After surviving the attempt, Weis eventually quit drinking and reconciled with his wife. Following his retirement from basketball, Weis and Celia began operating a tobacco shop and bar in Limoges. He is also a television analyst for French league games.

References

External links
Vince Carter dunks on Frederic Weis at the 2000 Olympics
FIBA Profile
Euroleague.net Profile
Spanish League Profile 
French League Profile  

1977 births
Living people
2006 FIBA World Championship players
Baloncesto Málaga players
Basketball players at the 2000 Summer Olympics
Bilbao Basket players
Centers (basketball)
Centre Fédéral de Basket-ball players
French expatriate basketball people in Greece
French expatriate basketball people in Spain
French men's basketball players
Greek Basket League players
Liga ACB players
Limoges CSP players
Medalists at the 2000 Summer Olympics
Menorca Bàsquet players
New York Knicks draft picks
Olympic basketball players of France
Olympic medalists in basketball
Olympic silver medalists for France
P.A.O.K. BC players
People from Thionville
Sportspeople from Moselle (department)